Bình Nhâm is a ward of Thuận An city in Bình Dương Province of Southeast region of Vietnam.

References

Populated places in Bình Dương province